Marchington is a civil parish in the district of East Staffordshire, Staffordshire, England.  The parish contains 28 listed buildings that are recorded in the National Heritage List for England.  Of these, three are listed at Grade II*, the middle grade, and the others are at Grade II, the lowest grade.  The parish contains the villages of Marchington and Marchington Woodlands and the surrounding countryside.  Most of the listed buildings are houses and cottages with associated structures, farmhouses and farm buildings, the earliest of which are timber framed.  The other listed buildings include churches, memorials in a churchyard, a small country house, three mileposts, and a telephone kiosk.

Key

Buildings

Notes and references

Notes

Citations

Sources

Lists of listed buildings in Staffordshire